WKVR-FM (92.3 FM) was a radio station licensed to Huntingdon, Pennsylvania, United States. The station was owned by Juniata College.

WKVR-FM signed on in March 1978; its license was granted on August 7, 1978. The license expired unrenewed on August 1, 2022, leading to the Federal Communications Commission (FCC) canceling it on November 7.

References

External links
 WKVR program schedule

KVR-FM
KVR-FM
Radio stations established in 1978
1978 establishments in Pennsylvania
Radio stations disestablished in 2022
2022 disestablishments in Pennsylvania
Defunct radio stations in the United States
KVR-FM